This is a list of episodes of the Teenage Mutant Ninja Turtles 2003 TV series. The series debuted on February 8, 2003 on the Fox Network as part of Fox's 4Kids TV Saturday morning lineup and ended on February 28, 2009. The series was produced by Mirage Studios, which owned one third of the rights to the show.

Series overview

Series

Season 1 (2003)

Teenage Mutant Ninja Turtles' first season originally aired between February 8, 2003 and November 1, 2003, beginning with the "Things Change" episode. The episodes were released in two separate volumes, the first on May 22, 2007 with twelve episodes, and the second on September 18, 2007 with fourteen episodes.

Season 2 (2003–04)
 The Shredder returns in season 2 and is revealed to be an Utrom named Ch'rell. Karai, the daughter of the Shredder makes her first appearance in this season.

Season 3 (2004–05)
 Many of the Ninja Turtles' enemies return in season 3. This is the final season that includes Utrom Shredder.

Season 4 (2005–06)
 For the entire season Karai is the leader of the Foot Clan. Hun controls the Purple Dragons. New enemies are seen in this season.

Season 5: Ninja Tribunal (2006)

To try to increase interest in the series, Fox aired the "Fast Forward" season on commercial TV in 2006. 4Kids Entertainment later signed a deal with Comcast and the season began airing on Comcast-On-Demand in August 2006; however, after airing five episodes, the airing was canceled. Fox later aired the "Membership Drive" episode on March 24, 2007, which was the first episode of the season to air on regular television. 4Kids TV started showing "The Ninja Tribunal" and the 12 completed episodes of this season on February 9, 2008. The season was promoted as the "Lost Episodes"

Season 6: Fast Forward (2006–07)
 
The sixth season, subtitled Fast Forward, originally aired between July 29, 2006 and October 27, 2007, beginning with the "Future Shellshock" episode. It includes new designs for all returning characters.

Season 7: Back to the Sewer (2008–2009)

For most of the final season of the series, subtitled Back to the Sewer, the Shredder of the virtual world of Cyberspace is the main villain, and Master Splinter is trapped deep within virtual limbo with a desperate Donatello resolved to restore his real world form.

"Mayhem from Mutant Island" shorts
Starting March 7, 2009, a series of 13 shorts, called "chapters", ranging from 90 seconds to two minutes in length, began airing on The CW4Kids during episodes of TMNT: Back to the Sewer and Chaotic: M'arrillian Invasion. They were streamed on the 4Kids website a week in advance of airing them on television. The episodes comprise a single story called "Mayhem from Mutant Island." On March 27, 2010 the 13 shorts were re-aired complied together as a single episode titled "Mayhem from Mutant Island".

Television film
A direct to TV and DVD movie based on the series was produced by 4Kids Entertainment; it aired on The CW4Kids on November 21, 2009.

Home releases

Reception
 The first season of the show received generally positive acclaim. As of December 2003 it had 2.89 million views on the 4kids website. It holds a current rank of 89%.
 The second season also received positive acclaim like its predecessor. Episodes such as the Turtles in Space arc and the City at War arc were critically acclaimed. As of October 2004 it had 3.06 million views on the 4kids website. Its rank was 90%. 
 The third season received critical acclaim. "Same As It Never" Was was its most-watched episode. As of May 2005, it had 3.56 million views and has a rank of 92%.
 The fourth season was also received well because of its darker stories. It had 2.25 million views as of May 2006 and has a rank of 86%.
 The fifth season was received well. As of June 2008, it had 1.45 million views and has a rank of 80%.
 The sixth season had mixed to somewhat negative reviews. The main reason was for its storyline change, brighter, sillier tone and the art style change. As of November 2007, it had 1.36 million views and has a rank of 76%.
 The seventh season was met with mainly negative reviews, with criticism of art style changes as well as the weak story arcs. It had the lowest number of views, 0.98 million views and a rank of 68% as of March 2009.

See also
Teenage Mutant Ninja Turtles (2003 TV series)
List of Teenage Mutant Ninja Turtles characters

References

General
 Official episode guide at the Mirage Studios website.  Retrieved on February 29, 2008
 Season 1, 2, 3, 4, 5, 6, 7
 Official TMNT & TMNT: Fast Forward episode guide at 4Kids TV website.  Retrieved on February 29, 2008
 Official TMNT: Back to the Sewer episode guide at 4Kids TV website.  Retrieved on September 14, 2008

Citations

External links
Episode list with detailed synopses at the Official Ninja Turtles website

Episodes
2003
Lists of American children's animated television series episodes
Lists of American science fiction television series episodes